Camptochaete monolina is a species of moss found in the Wet Tropics of Australia.

Description
Camptochaete monolina is a large moss (to 110 mm) with stem and branches covered in overlapping orbiculate to suborbiculate leaves. A robust midrib extends to 60% of the leaf length.

Distribution and habitat
It occurs as an lithophyte in simple microphyll vine-forest on Mount Bellenden Ker, Wooroonooran National Park, Far North Queensland.

References

Flora of Australia
Lembophyllaceae